Meri Lalkaar is a 1990 Indian Hindi-language film directed by Yesh Chauhaan, starring Sumeet Saigal in lead role.

Cast
Sumeet Saigal
Sreepradha
Rohini
Sadashiv Amrapurkar

Soundtrack 
The soundtrack was composed by Vijay Batalvi

References

External Links

1990 films
1990s Hindi-language films
Films scored by Vijay Batalvi